The riverbank warbler (Myiothlypis rivularis), sometimes known as the Neotropical river warbler or just river warbler (leading to confusion with Locustella fluviatilis), is a species of bird in the family Parulidae.

It is found at low levels near water in forests and woodlands. Its range includes three disjunct populations, with one (M. r. mesoleuca) in the eastern Amazon of Brazil, the Guianas, and southern and eastern Venezuela, the second (nominate subspecies) in the Atlantic Forest of south-eastern Brazil, eastern Paraguay and far north-eastern Argentina, and the final population (M. r. bolivianus) in the Yungas of Bolivia.

References

riverbank warbler
Birds of the Amazon Basin
Birds of the Guianas
Birds of the Yungas
Birds of the Atlantic Forest
riverbank warbler
Birds of Brazil
Taxonomy articles created by Polbot